Judy Irving is an American filmmaker. She directed the documentary The Wild Parrots of Telegraph Hill, about writer Mark Bittner's relationship with a flock of wild parrots. The film won the Genesis Award for "Outstanding Documentary Film" in 2005, and is one of the 25 top-grossing theatrical documentaries of all time with over $3 million in box-office receipts. On May 29, 2007, Parrots was featured on the PBS series Independent Lens.

A previous feature-length film, Dark Circle, won the Grand Prize at the Sundance Film Festival in 1983 as well as a National Emmy Award for "Outstanding Individual Achievement in News and Documentary" in 1990.

Irving earned a Bachelor of Arts degree from Connecticut College in 1968 and a master's degree in from Stanford University in 1973 She received a Guggenheim Fellowship in Film in 1983.  In 2006, she married Mark Bittner after the two fell in love during the filming of Parrots.

She is the executive director of Pelican Media, a San Francisco non-profit which produces environmentally themed films.

References

External links 
 
Profile of Judy Irving in the Washington Post (March 11, 2005)
Interview with Judy Irving in the Austin Chronicle about The Wild Parrots of Telegraph Hill (September 9, 2005)
Filmmaker Q&A with PBS's Independent Lens
Filmmaker bio on PBS's Independent Lens

Year of birth missing (living people)
Living people
Connecticut College alumni
Stanford University alumni
American film directors
News & Documentary Emmy Award winners